Laul is a village located in Madha Taluka of Solapur District in the State of Maharashtra, in India. It belongs to the Pune Division. It is located 81  km towards west from District headquarter Solapur. The village is located at about 380  km from the state capital, Mumbai.
Kurdu (5 km), Ghatane (6 km), Ujani Madha (6 km), Padsali (7 km), Ambad (Te) (7 km) are the nearby Villages to Laul. Laul is surrounded by Paranda Taluka towards North, Mohol Taluka towards East, Barshi Taluka towards East, Indapur Taluka towards west.
Pandharpur, Kurduvadi, Solapur, Osmanabad are the nearby Cities to Laul. The village follows the Panchayati raj system.

Laul also known as Sant Shri Kurmadas Maharaj Village. Laul have Spiritual History of Sant Shri Kurmadas Maharaj. On Ashadi Ekadhshi in Laul they celebrate Yatra of Sant Shri Kurmadas Maharaj from past 700 to 800 years.

Sant Shri Kurmadas Maharaj 
Laul also known as Sant Shri Kurmadas Maharaj Village. Laul have spiritual history of 'Sant Shri Kurmadas Maharaj'. And Laul is a place of Sant Shri Kurmadas Maharaj- well known sant in Maharashtra. He is Motivation to all Varkari. He is motivated to visit Pandharpur after hearing Bhanudhas Maharaj Kirtan. He don't have limbs, still he is motivated to visit 'Pandharpur'.
He, Sant Tukaram and Sant Dnyaneshwar were the popular sants and they worshiped 'Lord Vitthal'.
On Adshadi Ekadhshi in Laul they celebrates Yatra of Sant Shri Kurmadas Maharaj form past 700 to 800 years.
Varkari say's that 'Pandhri Vari' is completed after visiting 'Sant Shri Kurmadas Maharaj Temple'.
The 'Palakhi' in the month of 'Ashadh' from Laul is one of the main attractions of Laul. Many people have taken part in it many years. Sant Shri Kurmadas Maharaj Temple is at outside of Lual on Sant Eknath Maharaj Palkhi Margh(Pandharpur Road).

Demographics 
The population of Laul was 7516 as per 2011 census of India in 2011.
In 2011, the literacy rate of the Laul village was 76.36% compared to 82.34% of Maharashtra.

Political leaders 

 Ranjit Naik-Nimbalkar,Member of Parliament, Madha (Lok Sabha constituency), Bhartiya Janta Party
 Shri Babanrao Vitthalrao Shinde, Member of Legislative Assembly, Madha (Vidhan Sabha constituency), Nationalist Congress Party
 Shri Bharat Shinde, Member, Zilla Parishad: Modnimb Gat, Nationalist Congress Party
 Shri Dhanraj Shinde, Member, Taluka Panchayat Samiti: Laul Gan, Nationalist Congress Party

Delegates from Laul Village 

 Shri Prataprao Shankarrao Nalawade, Nationalist Congress Party, Former Deputy Sabhapati Madha Panchayat Samiti.
 Smt. Pooja Prashant Bodake, Sarpanch, Grampanchayat: Laul, Nationalist Congress Party
 Shri Sanjay (Bapu0 Sudhakar Lokare, Dy. Sarpanch, Grampanchayat: Laul, Nationalist Congress Party
 Society Chairman : Maj. Maruti Bhajandas Lokare, Nationalist Congress Party,  Former Indian Army , Corps of Military Police (India)

Education system 

There are three primary schools in Laul. ZP Primary School has up to 4th standard. ZP school has 8 subschools (Vasti Shaala) 
Jijamata English Medium School provides the English medium nursery and primary education.Sahyadri Public school is also good in providing primary education.
In Laul there is a HighSchool of Shri Swami Vivekananda Shikshan Sanstha, Kolhapur, which is named with Shri Kurmadas Vidyamandir.
There are about 1200 students are studying in all these schools. The school drop-out rate nearly is zero in Laul.

Water system 
The panchayat had full resources of water provided by a scheme of state government. The water supply for irrigation is also done by a canal from the river Bhima under the Bhima Sina Pump Irrigation Scheme.

Economy 
The main profession of the people in Laul is agriculture and animal husbandry so the economy heavily depends on the Monsoon. Laul is also the top milk producing village in Madha taluka. The canal water supply for the agriculture usage had been made from Ujani Dam, so it has boosted the economy. Many people in the village are clothing merchants.

The financial needs of people are completed by the public sector banks. The following banks have branches in Laul:

 Bank of India, Nationalized bank. ATM service is available. 
 Solapur District Central Co-operative bank, Cooperative bank.

References

 http://www.census2011.co.in/data/village/561967-laul-maharashtra.html

External links 
 

Villages in Solapur district